This is a list of political parties in the Canadian province of Nova Scotia.

Parties represented in the House of Assembly

Other registered parties

Historical parties 
 Anti-Confederation Party
 Cape Breton Labour Party
 Confederation Party
 Labour Party
 Marijuana Party
 Nova Scotia Party
 United Farmers of Nova Scotia

References

 
Parties
Nova Scotia

fr:Partis politiques canadiens#Nouvelle-Écosse